Ehmej Festival is a music festival held annually (since 2011) in Ehmej, a municipality located about 57 km north of Beirut, in the Byblos District. The festival's aims are to boost tourism, promote the Lebanese culture, and spread music and art from Byblos to the rest of the Lebanese area.

Performances

2011
 8eart
 Tony Kiwan
 Iwan
 Ayman Zbib
 Al Fersan Al Arbaa

2012
 Melhem Zein
 Hicham El Hajj
 Mouein Shreif
 Najwa Karam

2013
 Ramy Ayach
 Fares Karam
 Haifa Wehbe
 Wael Kfoury

2014
 Assi El Hellani
 Ragheb Alama
 Husein El Deek and Ali El Deek
 Wael Kfoury

See also
 Music of Lebanon
 Baalbeck International Festival
 Byblos International Festival
 Beiteddine Festival

References

Music festivals in Lebanon